Members of the Legislative Assembly of Costa Rica.

 = National Liberation Party (PLN)
 = Citizens' Action Party (PAC)
 = Social Christian Unity Party (PUSC)
 = National Restoration Party (PRN)
 = National Integration Party (PIN)
 = Social Christian Republican Party (PRSC)
 = Broad Front (FA)
 = Independent

References

Costa Rica, Deputies
Deputies